Stabler is a surname from several European languages. Most common among these is the English occupational surname for one who keeps livestock, from Middle English stabler, or a variant of the German occupational surname Stäbler, meaning an official who carries a staff of office.

The name may refer to:

People 

 Alexa Stabler-Adams, sports agent and daughter of Ken Stabler
 Arthur Fletcher Stabler, mayor of Newcastle upon Tyne, 1983
 Brian Stabler, parish administrator, St George's Church, Kendal
 Bryan Stabler, financial controller of Reading Football Club
 Carl Stabler, former manager and chairman of the Wick Football Club
Daniel Stabler, pseudonym of German expressionist poet, critic and writer Ernst Blass (1890–1939)
David Stabler, pseudonym of American author Robert Schnakenberg
 David Stabler, music critic for The Oregonian and 2003 Pulitzer Prize finalist for feature writing
 Donald B. Stabler (1908–1997), founder of Stabler Companies, philanthropist, and Lehigh University trustee; see Stabler Arena
 Edward Stabler, mayor of York, UK, 1779-1780
 Edward Stabler, founder and proprietor of the Stabler-Leadbeater Apothecary Shop
 Edward Stabler (1994–1883), engraver of seals for the United States Senate and other federal agencies; postmaster of Sandy Spring, MD
 Edward Stabler, Professor of Linguistics at the University of California, Los Angeles
 Edward Stabler Field, step-brother of Hamilton Easter Field
 George Stabler and Elizabeth E. Stabler, former owners of the 1830 Reynolds' Cottages in Sydney, Australia
 Griffin M. Stabler, American businessman with Carpenter Steel Company and Whitney Brothers
 Harold Stabler (1872–1945), English designer and craftsman
 Harry P. Stabler, State Assembly member representing California's 13th district, 1891–1893
 Helen Byrd Stabler (1927-1974), daughter of explorer Richard E. Byrd
 Isabella Stabler, wife of English professional footballer Ted Widdowfield
 James P. Stabler (1796–1840), chief engineer for two of the earliest US railroads
 Jane Stabler, English literary scholar and author, and 2003 winner of the Rose Mary Crawshay Prize
 Jane Stabler, Scottish actress in The Acid House
 Jason Stabler, Superintendent of Bureau Valley High School, Manlius, Illinois
 John Stabler, U.S. State Department emissary to Colombia 1927–1928; involved in the unsuccessful Barco oil concession negotiations
 John G. Stabler (1871–1940), Chief Justice of the South Carolina Supreme Court, 1935–1940
 Josephine Stabler, British engineer and 2019 recipient of the Safety and Wellbeing Award from the Nuclear Decommissioning Authority
 Katie Stabler, early explorer of Wind Cave in South Dakota
 Ken Stabler (1945–2015), American football player
 Kirk B. Stabler, 18th Commander of the U.S. Air Force Office of Special Investigations (AFOSI)
 Lisa Stabler, American businesswoman, president of Transportation Technology Center, Inc.
 Lonnie Stabler (1945-2013), mayor of Bryan, TX, 1995-2001
 Meghan Stabler, first openly transgender woman to receive the Working Mother of the Year award from Working Mother magazine, 2014 
 Oscar Richard Stabler, convicted member of the Duquesne Spy Ring
 Paul R. Stabler, Georgia politician
 Phoebe Stabler (1879–1955), English artist
 Robert W. Stabler, Hollywood-based movie and television producer for Back from the Dead and others
 Rose Stabler, American actress in Future Zone
 Sam Stabler, former captain and 2021 coach of the Chess Valley Rugby Football Club
 Sam Stabler, 3000m bronze medalist at the 2016 British Indoor Athletics Championships
 Samuel Stabler, mayor of Williamsport, PA, 1911–1916
 Simon Stabler, member of the Destructors, 2006-2008
 Stan Stabler, secretary, Alabama Law Enforcement Agency, 2016–2017
 Steve Stabler, co-founder of Motion Picture Corporation of America, co-president of Orion Pictures, co-founder of Destination Films
 Sydney Martyn Stabler, British diplomat, Officer of the Order of the British Empire, 1947
 Tanya Stabler Miller, medieval historian and author of The Beguines of Medieval Paris: Gender, Patronage, and Spiritual Authority and other works
 Tim Stabler, co-promoter of Trade nightclub in London
 V. P. Stabler, sheriff involved in the 1911 opera house lynching in Livermore, Kentucky
 Vastine Stabler, managing artistic director of the Swine Palace professional theatre company associated with Louisiana State University
 Vernon Stabler, owner of the Little-Stabler House, a home listed on the National Register of Historic Places in Butler County, Alabama
 Rev. W. Brooke Stabler, Provost of the Avon Old Farms School, 1940–1944
 W. Laird Stabler Jr. (1930–2008), American attorney and politician; Delaware Attorney General
 Wells Stabler (1919–2009), American ambassador to Jordan and Spain
 William Stabler Jr., fugitive criminal profiled on America's Most Wanted in 1992

Fictional characters 
 Anna Stabler, in the musical A Christmas Memory, based on the Truman Capote short story
 Bucky Stabler, in The Good Wife
 Carol Stabler, in the 1987 television series Beauty and the Beast
 Chris Stabler, in the 1978 television series The Next Step Beyond episode "The Haunted Inn"
 Danny Stabler, in the 2014 film Blood and Circumstance
 Dwayne Stabler, in the 1978 television film A Question of Love played by Ned Beatty
 Elliot Stabler, on the television series Law and Order: SVU
 Herb Stabler, in the play Herb Stabler, Wandering Spirit by Mike Beyer, performed at the Factory Theater in 1999
 Kathy Stabler, Bernie Stabler, and other family members, on the television series Law and Order: SVU
 Lisa and Tom Stabler, in the 1971 Mannix episode "Murder Times Three"
 Mrs. Stabler, in the 2014 film Blood and Circumstance played by Cynthia Watros
 Ray and Shirley Stabler, on the 2013–2020 television series Mom

See also 

 Stabler (disambiguation)

References